Nick Hits was a programming block on Nickelodeon,  which aired classic Nicktoons, it replaced Nick at Nite on weekends. The block launched on July 4, 2009 and ended on April 5, 2010. All of the block's programs were added to the lineup of the block that replaced it, Nick at Nite.

Programming

Former

 Aaahh!!! Real Monsters
 As Told by Ginger
 The Angry Beavers
 CatDog
 Hey Arnold!
 Invader Zim
 KaBlam!
 The Ren & Stimpy Show (Brazil only)
 Rocket Power
 Rocko's Modern Life
 Rugrats (except in Brazil)
 The Wild Thornberrys

See also
Nick at Nite
NickRewind
 

Nickelodeon
Latin American cable television networks
Nickelodeon programming blocks
2009 television series debuts
2010 television series endings